The Explorer class was a two-ship class of general purpose vessels of the Royal Australian Navy that served between 1960 and 1995.

Design
The Explorer class was a two-ship class of general purpose vessels built for the RAN. The ships had a displacement of 207 tons at standard load and 260 tons at full load. Propulsion machinery consisted of GM diesels, which supplied  to the two propeller screws, and allowed the vessel to reach . The ship's company consisted of 14 personnel. The ship's armament of light weapons (usually .50 calibre machine guns) were only fitted as needed.

Both were laid down in 1959, and were commissioned into the RAN in 1960.

Operational history
The Explorers' primary roles were hydrographic survey and reservist training, among other duties.

In December 1982, both vessels were decommissioned. Despite this, they remained active in training until the mid-1990s.

Ships
 - Sold 1994.
 - Sold 1995.

References
Citations

Bibliography

 

 
Auxiliary training ship classes
Auxiliary research ship classes